The year 678 BC was a year of the pre-Julian Roman calendar. In the Roman Empire, it was known as year 76 Ab urbe condita . The denomination 678 BC for this year has been used since the early medieval period, when the Anno Domini calendar era became the prevalent method in Europe for naming years.

Events

Births

Deaths
 Min, Marquis of Jin
 Duke Wu of Qin, ruler of the state of Qin
 Perdiccas I of Macedon

References